Chester W. "Chet" Morgan (18 May 1937 – 14 July 2018) was an American politician.

He was born in Manchester, Connecticut, on 18 May 1937, to parents Chester E. Morgan and Joanne, née Way. After graduating from Manchester High School in 1955, he married Sylvia McCarthy in 1957. The couple moved to Vernon in 1960, where they raised a family. Morgan enlisted in the Connecticut Army National Guard, serving thirty years and attaining the rank of sergeant major. He was first elected to the Connecticut House of Representatives in 1976, remaining in office until 1983. Morgan then served two terms on the city council and worked for the Connecticut Department of Public Utility Control in the 1990s. Morgan resigned from his position on the municipal zoning and planning commission in 2001 to contest the Vernon mayoralty. Outside of public and military service, Morgan worked for Pratt & Whitney and Kaman Aerospace.

He died at Manchester Memorial Hospital on 14 July 2018, aged 81.

References

1937 births
2018 deaths
Democratic Party members of the Connecticut House of Representatives
Connecticut city council members
Connecticut National Guard personnel
People from Manchester, Connecticut
People from Vernon, Connecticut